Saint Nohra (also Nuhra), St. Lucius  or Mar Nohra was a  Maronite saint and mar, still popular in Lebanon today.  The saint's name  derives from Aramaic, meaning "light". He was born in Persia (modern day Iran) in the third century, and is not to be confused with Pope Lucius I. 

According to the Maronite synaxarion, his day of remembrance is 22 July.
Also according to the Maronite Synaxarion, it is mentioned that he has travelled preaching the Gospel and suffered martyrdom in Smar Jbeil, Batroun, Lebanon. His name in Syriac means "light" and he is the patron saint of anyone suffering from blindness or eye diseases. His Church in Smar Jbeil is in the center of the town, on the main street leading the travelers to Batroun.

Churches and monasteries dedicated to Saint Nohra
Churches and monasteries, located in Lebanon, dedicated to Saint Nohra include:

The Monastery of Saint Nohra, Bsharri, North Governorate
Saint Nohra Church, Deir el Ahmar, Beqaa Valley, Beqaa Governorate
Saint Nohra Church, Deria, Batroun, North Governorate
Saint Nohra Church, Dmalsa Jbeil, Mount Lebanon Governorate
Saint Nohra Church, El Hed, Akkar, North Governorate
Saint Nohra Church, Furn el Shubbak, Beirut, Beirut Governorate
Saint Nohra Church, Hardine, North Governorate
Saint Nohra Church, Smar Jbeil, Batroun, North Governorate
Saint Nohra Church, Ghbaleh, Keserwan, Mount Lebanon
Saint Nohra Church, Aintoura El-Metn, Mount Lebanon
Saint Nohra Church, Sahel Alma, Jounieh, Mount Lebanon

References

Year of birth missing
Year of death missing

Christian saints in unknown century
Maronite saints
Lebanese saints
Lebanese Maronites
Catholic devotions